The 1995 Sonoma State Cossacks football team represented Sonoma State University as a member of the Northern California Athletic Conference (NCAC) during the 1995 NCAA Division II football season. Led by third-year head coach Frank Scalercio, Sonoma State compiled an overall record of 0–8–1 with a mark of  0–3–1 in conference play, placing last out of three teams in the NCAC. The team was outscored by its opponents 374 to 75 for the season. The average score in the eight losses was 44–7. The Cossacks played home games at Cossacks Stadium in Rohnert Park, California.

Schedule

Team players in the NFL
The following Sonoma State player was selected in the 1996 NFL Draft.

Notes

References

Sonoma State
Sonoma State Cossacks football seasons
Sonoma State Cossacks football